Dmitriy Vergun (Dmitriy Nikolayevich Vergun, Dmytro Mykolayovych Vergun; 1871–1951) was a publicist, journalist, Russian-language poet, and literary historian from Galicia.

Biography
Born in a town of Horodok near Lviv of Austria-Hungary Galicia, in 1899 Vergun defended his doctoral dissertation "Miletiy Smotrytskyi as western-Russian writer and grammarian" in Vienna University. In 1900-1905 he was publishing in Vienna a neo-Slavophillic magazine "Slavianskiy vek". The neo-Slavism in Austria-Hungary were sponsored by Russian aristocracy, particularly Count Vladimir Bobrinskiy who was financing the magazine "Slavianskiy vek". Vergun also was a member of Galician-Russian Charitable Society (1902-1914) that was financed by the Russian Orthodox Church.

In 1918-1919 Vergun was teaching Slavic philology in Moscow University and Irkutsk University.

Along with Pyotr Gatalak and Dmitriy Markov promoted the idea of Carpathian Russians.

Due to the Russian Civil War, 1922-1945 he was teaching Russian language and Slavic Studies in the Prague Higher School. Since 1945 Vergun was a professor at the Houston University.

He died in Houston Texas in 1951.

Works

Poetry
 Slavic bells
 Red Russian echoes. Lemberg, 1901, 1907
 Carpathian echoes. 1920
 Cantata for Gogol

Among his poems used to be successful his "Slavic bells". Many of his poems converted into songs ("Russian Sokol march" by Vojtěch Hlaváč, "Cantata to Gogol" by Arkhangelskiy, "Go ahead, people of the Red Russia!" by Ludmilla Schollar)

Literary History
 Religious persecutions of Carpathian Russians. Saint Petersburg, 1913
 Yevgeniy A. Fentsik and his place in Russian literature. Uzhhorod, 1926
 Measures of Minister Bachak in suppression of 1849 Carpathian Russian revival with memorandums by Adolf Dobrjanský. Prague, 1938
 Slavic conversations. "Slavic Age", 1900, No. 1, 2, 4
 AI Herzen and the Slavic question. Ibid., 1901, No. 19
 At the crossroads of two cultures: Slavdom from Gdańsk to Trieste. Ibid., 1901, No. 23/24
 Autobiography. In the book: Vergun DN Poems. Lviv, 1901
 Panslavism and pan-Germanism. "Slavic Age", 1903, No. 67, 69, 72
 German "Drang nach Osten" in numbers and facts. Vienna, 1905
 What you need to know about the Slavs. Saint Petersburg, 1908
 Austro-Slavicism and Russo-Slavicism. In the book: Lado. Saint Petersburg, 1911
 Russia and Turkey. Saint Petersburg, 1911
 What is Galicia. Saint Petersburg, 1915
 The latest Carpatho-Russian bibliography. New York, 1920
 Introduction to Slavonic studies. Prague, 1924
 Eight lectures on Subcarpathian Russia. Prague, 1925
 Review of Carpatho-Russian literature. Prague, 1925
 The legend of Fyodor Kuzmich. "Notes of the Russian Historical Society", 1927, vol. 1
 To the historiography of neo-Slavism. In: Proceedings of the IV Congress of Russian Academic Organizations Abroad, Part 1. Belgrade, 1929
 In memory of YA Yavorsky. In: Timeline of the Stauropean Institute for 1938. Lviv, 1938.

External links
 Yas, O.V. Vergun Dmitriy Nikolayevich (ВЕРГУН Дмитро Миколайович). Encyclopedia of History of Ukraine

1871 births
1951 deaths
People from Horodok, Lviv Oblast
People from the Kingdom of Galicia and Lodomeria
Russophiles of Galicia
University of Houston